Vagif Aliyev Gadir oghlu (born June 17, 1953) is an Azerbaijani politician and the First Deputy minister of the Ministry of Culture of Azerbaijan Republic.

Early life

He was born on June 17, 1953. In 1975, he graduated from the faculty of Physics in Azerbaijan State University. During 1975-82, he worked as an engineer, junior researcher, group leader and senior teacher in Space Research Institute of Natural Resources of the Azerbaijan National Academy of Sciences. in 1982-1988, he was the Secretary of the Komsomol of the Azerbaijan State University. In 1988-1994, he worked as a senior lecturer at the faculty of Physics in Baku State University.

Political career

In 1994-2003, he held the position of First Deputy Minister of Sport, Youth and Tourism. From April 2003 till 2011 February, he held the position of the head of the Executive power of Sumqayit. Since 18 February 2011 he is First Deputy Minister of The Ministry of Culture and Tourism of Azerbaijan Republic.  He has PhD in Physics and Mathematics (1980).

He is a member of New Azerbaijan Party Management and political board.

Personal life

He is married and has 3 children.

See also

Sumgayit
Politics of Azerbaijan

References

External links 
The website of Ministry of Culture and Tourism (Azerbaijan
The website of The Executive Power of Sumgayit City
New Azerbaijan Party website
Baku State University

Living people
Mayors of places in Azerbaijan
People from Sumgait
New Azerbaijan Party politicians
Government ministers of Azerbaijan
1953 births